Pleasant Lake, also known as the New York Central Railroad Depot, is a historic train station located at Pleasant Lake, Steuben Township, Steuben County, Indiana. It was built in 1882 by the Lake Shore and Michigan Southern Railway, and is a one-story, rectangular, Gothic Revival style frame building.  It has a gable roof and is clad in board and batten siding.

It was listed on the National Register of Historic Places in 2001 as the Pleasant Lake Depot.

References

|services= 

Railway stations on the National Register of Historic Places in Indiana
Gothic Revival architecture in Indiana
Railway stations in the United States opened in 1882
Former New York Central Railroad stations
National Register of Historic Places in Steuben County, Indiana
Transportation buildings and structures in Steuben County, Indiana
Former railway stations in Indiana